Adam Edelen (born November 26, 1974, in Meade County, Kentucky) is an American businessman, solar energy entrepreneur, and politician who served as the Auditor of Public Accounts for the Commonwealth of Kentucky from January 2, 2012, to January 4, 2016. Prior to that, he was the Chief of Staff for democratic Kentucky Governor Steve Beshear from July 2008 until September 15, 2010.  He resigned from his position as the governor’s Chief of Staff to work as a business consultant, before running for the Auditor of Public Accounts for the Commonwealth of Kentucky. In 2019, he ran for Governor of Kentucky with running mate Gill Holland, where he fell short of the Democratic Nomination finishing in third place.

Early years and career
Edelen was born on a family farm in Meade County, Kentucky. His mother was two months shy of her 17th birthday when he was born. His parents divorced when he was young and his time as a child was divided between his mother's home in Louisville and his father's farm in rural Meade County.

Edelen is a graduate of the University of Kentucky, where he was a member of Delta Tau Delta social fraternity.

At 21, he began his public service career as one of the youngest aides ever to serve a Kentucky governor (Paul Patton). He went on to gain experience in the private sector as a senior executive with both the Greater Lexington Chamber of Commerce (Commerce Lexington) and Thomas & King, Inc.

In 2008, he returned to the public sector, serving as Director of the Kentucky Office of Homeland Security and then as Chief of Staff to Governor Steve Beshear.

Kentucky Auditor
Edelen won election to Kentucky Auditor of Public Accounts on November 8, 2011, defeating Republican John T. Kemper III by a margin of 11.6%.

Within days of being sworn in, Edelen announced a special examination into the former administration of the Kentucky Department of Agriculture. This examination was conducted at the request of the Republican Agriculture Commissioner, James Comer. The examination found rampant spending abuses and a culture of entitlement. Former commissioner and UK basketball star Richie Farmer was sentenced to 27 months in prison on federal charges and a year in prison on a state charge based on issues identified in Edelen's report.

Edelen also led an effort to reform special districts, which represent a $2.7 billion layer of government. The effort resulted in a report and a database that allowed the public to see basic financial information about roughly 1,200 entities such as libraries, fire districts and health departments. In 2013, Edelen helped shepherd a measure through the legislature to bring more accountability and transparency to the entities. House Bill 1 – as dubbed by the Speaker of the House-passed with broad, bipartisan support. The National State Auditors Association selected the initiative as one of its Excellence in Accountability Award recipients. The initiative was called the "biggest good government initiative we have had since the 1990s" by the leadership of Common Cause KY.

When private, multibillion-dollar insurance companies took over the state's Medicaid system, Edelen made recommendations that the state and managed care organizations (MCOs) could implement immediately to solve problems associated with implementation. The Auditor's office found the managed care companies were not efficiently processing claims to health care providers despite receiving more than 700 million taxpayer dollars. Edelen created a new Medicaid Accountability and Transparency Unit in the Auditor's office to provide real-time oversight over the second-largest expenditure in state government.

In 2012, Edelen began examining spending practices in public schools. Special examinations in 15 public school districts found wasteful spending, lack of oversight of superintendent contracts by school boards and other abuses. One exam led to criminal conviction of a former superintendent and more than $500,000 returned to the community. Based on Edelen's recommendations, the Kentucky Department of Education now requires school districts to submit superintendent contracts for posting on a publicly accessible website.

In 2014, Edelen proposed legislation to strengthen Kentucky's cyber security protections and require state and local government to notify citizens if their data is compromised in a data breach. Kentucky was one of four states that lacked security breach notification laws. House Bill 5 passed the House 99–1 and the Senate unanimously.

In 2015, Edelen lost his re-election bid to Republican Mike Harmon.

The efforts of Edelen's auditor administration to expose the practice of special districts was a focus of a segment on Last Week Tonight with John Oliver.

Eastern Kentucky solar project 
In 2017, news articles began circulating which detailed a project in which Edelen is involved that plans to install tens of thousands of solar panels on a reclaimed surface mine in eastern Kentucky. The project is expected to put hundreds of out-of-work coal miners into long-term, well-paying jobs building and installing the panels. Once completed, it will be the first large-scale solar panel project in the Appalachian region, and the largest in Kentucky. In a 2018 interview with Kentucky Today, Edelen said he was prioritizing the project over a run for governor.

In January 2019, Edelen said the power has been sold and the project will move forward within the next few weeks.

2019 Kentucky gubernatorial campaign 

After nearly four years away from politics and in the private sector, Edelen declared his candidacy for the Democratic nomination for governor of Kentucky on January 7, 2019, making him the fourth and final Democrat to enter the race. Edelen chose Gill Holland, a Louisville community builder, filmmaker, and environmentalist, as his lieutenant governor candidate.

The ticket touted a platform of no PAC contributions, a living wage, acknowledgement of climate change, green jobs, fully funded public and higher education, universal broadband internet, expanded healthcare and protection of the Medicaid expansion. Edelen also pledged to appoint women to at least six of Kentucky's 12 cabinet positions. He came in third in the primary.

Awards
Edelen was one of Government Technology magazine's 2014 Top 25 Doers, Dreamers and Drivers, an award bestowed on innovators in the public sector across the country. In 2008, Edelen was named one of the Ten Outstanding Young Americans by the United States Junior Chamber of Commerce. This award is arguably the oldest and most prestigious service award in the nation and previous honorees include presidents John F. Kennedy, Richard Nixon, Gerald Ford and Bill Clinton.

Other honors include:
 The NewDEAL leader
 New Leaders Council 40 Under 40 Leadership Award recipient
 Kentucky Jr. Chamber of Commerce Outstanding Young Kentuckian 
 Aspen Institute Rodel fellow
 Lexington Young Professionals Association Rising Star
 American-Swiss Foundation Young Leader
 United States Marshall Fund Fellow

Community service
As a two-term gubernatorial appointee to the board of Kentucky Educational Television, Chairman Edelen was the driving force behind the "Be Well Kentucky" initiative—an acclaimed effort which addresses Kentucky's public health crisis. While vice-president of the Commerce Lexington, Edelen was responsible for the nationally recognized New Century Lexington Reports on Community Livability, which used a broad range of metrics for measuring Lexington's quality of life.  Edelen has also chaired the United Way of the Bluegrass Annual Campaign and the Lexington Fayette County Urban League. He has also served as a member of the Prichard Committee for Academic Excellence.

Personal life
Edelen has two twin sons, Wade and Hamilton. Edelen makes his home in Lexington, Kentucky. He is a member of Lexington's First Presbyterian Church. He is an avid sportsman, reader of history, and University of Kentucky basketball fan.

References

1974 births
Kentucky Democrats
Living people
People from Meade County, Kentucky
State Auditors of Kentucky
University of Kentucky alumni